Enteromius evansi is a species of ray-finned fish in the genus Enteromius from the Catumbela and Kwanza river systems in Angola.

The fish is named in honor of J. R. Evans, who accompanied Fowler on the Gray African Expedition in Angola.

Footnotes 

 

Endemic fauna of Angola
Enteromius
Taxa named by Henry Weed Fowler
Fish described in 1930